The 2016 Norfolk State Spartans football team represented Norfolk State University in the 2016 NCAA Division I FCS football season. They were led by second-year head coach Latrell Scott and played their home games at William "Dick" Price Stadium. They were a member of the Mid-Eastern Athletic Conference (MEAC). They finished the season 4–7, 3–5 in MEAC play to finish in a three way tie for seventh place.

Schedule

Source: Schedule

References

Norfolk State
Norfolk State Spartans football seasons
Norfolk State Spartans football